Kunigunda Rostislavna (1245 – 9 September 1285; Czech: Kunhuta Uherská or Kunhuta Haličská) was Queen consort of Bohemia and its regent from 1278 until her death. She was a member of the House of Chernigov, and a daughter of Rostislav Mikhailovich.

Family
She was presumably born in Ruthenia, in the domains of her paternal grandfather Michael of Chernigov. Her grandfather was the last Grand Prince of Kiev, who was deposed not by a more powerful prince but by the Mongol Empire. Her parents were Rostislav Mikhailovich, future ruler of Belgrade and Slavonia, and his wife Anna of Hungary. After the death of her father's father, Kunigunda's family relocated to Hungary, where her mother's father, Béla IV of Hungary, made her father governor of certain Serbian-speaking regions in the Danube Valley. Her father proclaimed himself Emperor of Bulgaria in 1256 but did not stay there to defend his title.

Marriage 

Kunigunda was married – as a token of alliance from her maternal grandfather Béla – to King Ottokar II of Bohemia (ca. 1233 – 1278) in Pressburg (now Bratislava) on 25 October 1261. Ottokar was paternally a member of the Přemyslid dynasty whose marriage to Margaret, Duchess of Austria (ca. 1204 – 1266) was annulled.

Kunigunda, 41 years Margaret's junior, bore Ottokar several children including:
 Kunigunde of Bohemia (January, 1265 – 27 November 1321). Married Boleslaus II of Masovia.
 Agnes of Bohemia (5 September 1269 – 17 May 1296). Married Rudolf II, Duke of Austria.
 Wenceslaus II of Bohemia (17 September 1271 – 21 June 1305).

Queen and regent of Bohemia 

However, the peace between Bohemia and Hungary ended after 10 years, when Kunigunda's uncle Stephen came to power as the King of Hungary.

In 1278, King Ottokar tried to recover his lands lost to Rudolph I of Germany in 1276. He made allies and collected a large army, but he was defeated by Rudolph and killed at the Battle of Dürnkrut and Jedenspeigen on the March on 26 August 1278.

Moravia was subdued and its government entrusted to Rudolph's representatives, leaving Kunigunda, now Queen Regent of Bohemia in control of only the province surrounding Prague, while the young Wenceslaus was betrothed and married to one of Rudolph's daughters, Judith.

Kunigunda married secondly a Bohemian magnate Záviš, Lord of Falkenštejn, in Prague in 1285. However, she died only a few months later. Záviš survived her and married again to the Hungarian Princess Elisabeth. He was executed on behalf of the King on 24 August 1290.

Kunigunda's son Wenceslaus II kept the Kingdom of Bohemia, and also succeeded in obtaining Poland and Hungary although not very sustainably. Ultimately, she is one of the pivotal ancestresses of both the House of Luxembourg and the Habsburgs.

Ancestors

Literature
 
 

|-

1245 births
1285 deaths
People from Galicia–Volhynia
13th-century Hungarian people
13th-century Croatian people
13th-century Bohemian people
Olgovichi family
Bohemian queens consort
Hungarian people of Ukrainian descent
Hungarian people of Russian descent
Czech people of Ukrainian descent
Czech people of Russian descent
Czech people of Hungarian descent
13th-century women rulers
Kievan Rus' princesses
Ottokar II of Bohemia
Remarried royal consorts
13th-century Bohemian women
13th-century Hungarian women
13th-century Croatian women
13th-century Rus' people
13th-century Rus' women
Queen mothers